The 2009 AFC Champions League Final was a football match which was played on Saturday, 7 November 2009. It was the 28th final of the AFC Champions League, Asia's premier club football tournament, and the first single match final since 2002 when the competition was known as the Asian Club Championship. The match was played at the National Stadium in Tokyo and it was contested between Al-Ittihad of Saudi Arabia and Pohang Steelers of South Korea. The winners Pohang Steelers were also entered the quarter-finals of the 2009 FIFA Club World Cup. 

Pohang Steelers defeated Al-Ittihad 2–1, winning its third title to become the most successful club in Asian football.

Qualified teams

Road to Tokyo

Match details

See also
2009 AFC Champions League
2009 FIFA Club World Cup

References

External links
 Video highlights

Final
2009
Ittihad FC matches
AFC Champions League Final
2009 in Japanese football
2009